Strange but True? is a British Paranormal documentary television show that aired on ITV for four seasons, from 21 May 1993 to 7 November 1997 and was hosted by Michael Aspel.

Premise
The series explored a number of aspects of unexplained activity, from ghosts and poltergeists, to near-death experiences, vampires and aliens. The series involved filmed reconstructions of classic cases with actors and interviews with the original participants and researchers in each event. Story consultant for all episodes was paranormal researcher Jenny Randles.

Transmissions

Regular

Specials

References

External links
 

1993 British television series debuts
1997 British television series endings
British supernatural television shows
English-language television shows
ITV documentaries
London Weekend Television shows
Paranormal television
Television series by ITV Studios